Antonio "Anthony" Mastromauro (born 1975) is an American film producer. He is the President and Founder of Identity Films an independent production company based out of Los Angeles, California.

Mastromauro's films include As Cool as I Am starring Sarah Bolger, Claire Danes, and James Marsden, as well as After the Fall and Black Butterfly.

Prior to working in the film industry, Mastromauro worked on Wall Street as the Senior Vice President for Oppenheimer Holdings.

Filmography
He was a producer in all films unless otherwise noted.

Film

As an actor

Thanks

Television

Footnotes

External links

1975 births
Living people
American film producers